Harvey Films (also known as Harvey Entertainment, The Harvey Entertainment Company or simply Harvey) is the production arm of comic book publisher Harvey Comics. It was a family business formed in the 1940s and was founded in 1957.

In the early 1960s, they created Harvey Funnies, the original entertainment company to produce The New Casper Cartoon Show.

Currently, Harvey Films is owned by DreamWorks Classics, formerly Classic Media, which is owned by DreamWorks Animation, which is also owned by NBCUniversal all owned by Comcast.

Harvey Films v. Columbia Pictures
On October 28, 1986, Harvey Films had a lawsuit with Columbia Pictures claiming that the logo for the film Ghostbusters was similar to the logo for The Ghostly Trio, specifically the ghost in the logo was similar to Fatso, and Columbia argued that Fatso was only a portion of their, at the time, renewed trademark, and there were three ghosts instead of just one. The court argued that the logos are largely dissimilar and that The Ghostly Trio had only the words of the trademark and the three ghosts while the logo for Ghostbusters has a sign for prohibition with only the torso and head of only one ghost. The expressions are different, with their ghosts having mischievous or evil facial expressions, while the other one is bewildered. The court said "Accordingly, the Court concludes that the claimed likelihood of confusion has no material basis in fact. The sole evidence which Harvey has produced on this issue are excerpts from magazine articles which suggest a general association between the "Ghostbusters" logo and "Casper" comics. It is clear from reading these articles that there was no confusion whatsoever on the part of the authors. A finding of general association, that the "Ghostbusters" logo is reminiscent of "Casper" characters, does not mean that the prospective moviegoer in purchasing a ticket for "Ghostbusters" thinks that he is going to see a "Casper" cartoon. Neither does it mean that he will think that "Ghostbusters" is derived from "Casper" cartoons or that it is sponsored by the same source as "Casper." " The court dismissed the case for not violating their trademark.

List of Harvey Films productions
Theatrical films
The Sad Sack (1957 film starring Jerry Lewis)
Richie Rich (1994 theatrical film) (co-production with Warner Bros. Family Entertainment)
Casper (1995 theatrical film) (co-production with Universal Pictures and Amblin Entertainment)

TV series
Matty's Funday Funnies (1959–1962)
The New Casper Cartoon Show (1963–1964) (co-production with Paramount Cartoon Studios)
Casper and the Angels (1979–1980) (co-production with Hanna-Barbera)
Casper's Halloween Special (TV special) (1979) (co-production with Hanna-Barbera)
Casper's First Christmas (TV special) (1979) (co-production with Hanna-Barbera)
The Richie Rich/Scooby-Doo Show (1980–1982) (co-production with Hanna-Barbera)
The Pac-Man/Little Rascals/Richie Rich Show (1982–1984) (co-production with Hanna-Barbera)
Casper and Friends (1990–1994)
Casper: Classics (1994–1995)
The Baby Huey Show (1994–1996) (co-production with Carbunkle Cartoons (season 1) and Film Roman (season 2))
Casper (1996–1998) (aka The Spooktacular New Adventures of Casper) (co-production with Amblin Television and Universal Cartoon Studios)
Richie Rich (1996) (co-production with Film Roman)
The Harveytoons Show (1996–2001)
Casper's Scare School (2009) (co-production with The Harvey Entertainment Company)
Harvey Girls Forever! (2018–2020) (co-production with DreamWorks Animation Television)

Direct-to-video
Casper: A Spirited Beginning (1997) (co-production with Saban Entertainment and 20th Century Fox Home Entertainment)
Casper Meets Wendy (1998) (co-production with Saban Entertainment and 20th Century Fox Home Entertainment)
Richie Rich's Christmas Wish (1998) (co-production with Saban Entertainment and Warner Bros. Family Entertainment)
Baby Huey's Great Easter Adventure (1999) (co-production with Columbia TriStar Home Video)
Casper's Haunted Christmas (2000) (co-production with Universal Home Entertainment and Mainframe Entertainment)
Casper's Scare School (2006) (co-production with Philips Filmstudio Inc.)

References

External links
NBCUniversal Official Website

Harvey Comics
American animation studios
Mass media companies established in 1957
Film production companies of the United States
Television production companies of the United States
DreamWorks Classics
Universal Pictures subsidiaries
NBCUniversal